Neotogaria saitonis is a moth in the family Drepanidae. It was described by Shōnen Matsumura in 1931. It is found in Vietnam, China (Shaanxi, Zhejiang, Guangdong, Yunnan) and Taiwan.

Subspecies
Neotogaria saitonis saitonis (Taiwan)
Neotogaria saitonis sinjaevi Laszlo, G. Ronkay, L. Ronkay & Witt, 2007 (Vietnam, China: Shaanxi, Zhejiang, Guangdong, Yunnan)

References

Moths described in 1931
Thyatirinae
Moths of Asia